Dob is a village in the Municipality of Domžale in the Upper Carniola region of Slovenia. The settlement used to be part of the Krumperk lordship.

Sports

The association football club NK Dob (Nogometni klub Dob) is based in Dob.

References

External links 

Dob on Geopedia

Populated places in the Municipality of Domžale